= EasyCare Vehicle Service Contracts 200 =

EasyCare Vehicle Service Contracts 200 may refer to:

- The EasyCare Vehicle Service Contracts 200 (spring), a NASCAR Craftsman Truck Series race held at Atlanta Motor Speedway in March 2004
- The EasyCare Vehicle Service Contracts 200 (fall), a NASCAR Craftsman Truck Series race held at Atlanta Motor Speedway in October from 2005 to 2007
